Saxifraga svalbardensis is a species of flowering plant in the family Saxifragaceae, endemic to Svalbard. It arose, probably after the end of the last ice age, as a hybrid between Saxifraga rivularis (the seed parent) and S.cernua (the pollen parent).

References

svalbardensis
Flora of Svalbard
Plants described in 1975